In Greek mythology, a nymph is a female nature-spirit.

Nymph may also mean:

Nymph (biology), the immature form of an insect having incomplete metamorphosis 
Nymph (fishing), a lure that imitates the insect life-stage
, a Royal Navy sloop launched in 1778
, a Union Navy steamer in the American Civil War
BN-3 Nymph, original name of the NAC Freelance airplane
The Nymphs (poem), by Leigh Hunt, published in 1818
Nymph (Central Figure for "The Three Graces"), a bronze sculpture in Washington, D.C.
The Nymphs, a 1990s US-American alternative rock band
The Nymphs (album), released in 1991
The Nymph (Ninfa plebea), a 1996 Italian film directed by Lina Wertmüller
Nymph (1973 film), a 1973 American film
Nymph (2009 film), a 2009 Thai film
Nymphs (TV series), a 2013 Finnish TV series
Nymph, the "Beta Angeloid: Electronic Warfare Type" in the anime Sora no Otoshimono
Nymph (Dungeons & Dragons), a monster in the Dungeons & Dragons role-playing game
Nymph, Alabama, a populated place in Conecuh County, Alabama
Nymph (album), a 2022 album by British rapper Shygirl
"Nymph", a song by Brooke Candy from the album Sexorcism

See also
Jungle nymph, a type of large stick insect found in Malaysia
Water nymph, several species of aquatic plants in the Nymphaeaceae family
Nymphet
Nymphadora Tonks, Harry Potter character.